Merton and Wandsworth is a constituency in the London Assembly. Since the 2016 election, it has been represented by Labour's Leonie Cooper.

It consists of the combined area of the London Borough of Merton and the London Borough of Wandsworth.

Constituency profile
Created in 2000, Merton and Wandsworth had elected only Conservative AMs until 2016. The current AM is Leonie Cooper of the Labour Party, first elected in 2016.

Assembly members

Mayoral election results 
Below are the results for the candidate which received the highest share of the popular vote in the constituency at each mayoral election.

Assembly election results

References

London Assembly constituencies
Politics of the London Borough of Merton
Politics of the London Borough of Wandsworth
2000 establishments in England
Constituencies established in 2000